Major-General James Alexander Kenneth Mackay,  (5 June 1859 – 16 November 1935), usually known as Kenneth Mackay, was an Australian soldier and politician.



Personal life

Born at Wallendenbeen station near Wallendbeen, the second son to pastoralist Alexander Mackay and Annie Mackenzie, he attended Camden College and Sydney Grammar School before farming at his father's property. His brother Donald Mackay went on to aerially survey areas of central Australia.

In 1890 Mackay married Mabel White from Victoria, a member of a squatter family.  He died at Cootamundra in 1935, survived by his wife and two daughters (Annie Mabel Baldry and Agnes Jean).

Military and political life

Loving horses, including being an amateur jockey, in 1885 he joined the military volunteers and raised the West Camden Light Horse; he was a commissioned as a captain in 1886.

In 1897 he raised the 1st Australian Volunteer Horse Regiment, and he was elevated lieutenant colonel in 1898.  His military force was captured in two poems by Scottish-Australian poet Will H. Ogilvie (1869–1963), in The real Mackays! (1898) and Your chance, Mackays! (1899).

In 1895 he was elected to the New South Wales Legislative Assembly as the member for Boorowa, serving until 1899, when he was appointed to the Legislative Council. Mackay served as Vice-President of the Executive Council and Representative of the Government in the Legislative Council in the Lyne ministry from September 1899 to April 1900, when he left to serve in the Boer War until 1901, commanding the 6th Imperial Bushmen's contingent of New South Wales. He saw action at Elands River, was mentioned in despatches, and made a Companion of the Order of the Bath (CB). Mackay was awarded the South African War Medal with four clasps, (Rhodesia, Transvaal, Orange River Colony and Cape Colony) Whilst in South Africa he stood as a candidate for the Australian Senate at the 1901 election, but was unsuccessful. He returned from South Africa in July 1901. He resumed his former position of Vice President of the Executive Council and Representative of the Government in the Legislative Council in 1903 as part of the See ministry, serving until 1904. He continued to serve in the Legislative Council until 1934 when the council was reformed by members indirectly elected by the Parliament.

Promoted colonel and then brigadier in 1912 and awarded the Volunteer Officers' Decoration. He drew up plans for the Australian Army Reserve in 1915, and became its first director-general in 1916.  Considered too old, he was not appointed to active service overseas in World War I. He was appointed to conduct an inquiry into the Liverpool riot of 1916 by soldiers at the Liverpool and Casula camps. In 1920 he was promoted brigadier general and later retired as a major general. He was appointed an Officer of the Order of the British Empire on his retirement.

Writings

Kenneth Mackay published three books of poetry, including Stirrup jingles of sporting and bush verse, and two novels from 1887 to 1908.  His books included Outback (1893), The Yellow Wave (1895), and Across Papua.

In 1896 he published a play, To the West, a collaboration with Alfred Dampier.

His poems included the Sons of Britannia still we are (1898)

References

External links 
 James Alexander Mackay at Australian Dictionary of Biography (ADB.anu.edu.au)
 

1859 births
1935 deaths
19th-century Australian writers
20th-century Australian writers
Australian Companions of the Order of the Bath
Australian farmers
Australian generals
Australian military personnel of the Second Boer War
Australian military personnel of World War I
Australian Officers of the Order of the British Empire
Australian male short story writers
Members of the New South Wales Legislative Assembly
Members of the New South Wales Legislative Council
Military personnel from New South Wales
People from Cootamundra